Queen Blanche may refer to:

 Blanche of Castile (1188–1252)
 Blanche of Namur (1320–1363)
 Queen Blanche (painting), painting by Albert Edelfelt (1877)